Mesyatsia is a genus of winter stoneflies in the family Taeniopterygidae. There are about six described species in Mesyatsia.

Species
These six species belong to the genus Mesyatsia:
 Mesyatsia imanishii (Uéno, 1929)
 Mesyatsia karakorum (Šámal, 1935)
 Mesyatsia makartchenkoi Teslenko & Zhiltzova, 1992
 Mesyatsia nigra Zwick, 1980
 Mesyatsia o-notata (Okamoto, 1922)
 Mesyatsia tianshanica (Zhiltzova, 1972)

References

Further reading

 
 

Taeniopterygidae